Leamer is a surname. Notable people with the surname include:

Edward Leamer (born 1944), economist and professor at UCLA
Laurence Leamer (born 1941), author and Kennedy family expert